Stoke Prior is a village in the civil parish of Ford and Stoke Prior in Herefordshire, England, and is  south-east from Leominster.

The village' population is included with Ford and Stoke Prior; at the 2011 census this was 364.

Stoke Prior Community Primary School has three classes for children from the ages of 4 to 11. In a 2007 Ofsted inspection, the Overall effectiveness of the school was rated as Grade 1 (Outstanding).

At the Stoke Prior Halt railway station, Stoke Prior was served by the now closed Worcester, Bromyard and Leominster Railway.

External links

Stoke Prior Community Primary School

References

Villages in Herefordshire